Alkira Secondary College, formerly Casey Central Secondary College, is a public government secondary school in Cranbourne North, Victoria, Australia. It opened with Year 7 classes in 2009 and currently has a student population of 1,621 students.

Location 
Alkira Secondary College is situated on Nurture Avenue, Cranbourne North, in the Eve Estate residential development. It is also not far from Hillsmeade Primary School, where Alkira first was established. The area surrounding the school was originally semirural, with the school bordering a farm on two sides. However, since early 2013 much of the area surrounding the school has been turned into newly established suburbs, the school however continues to be bordered by the same farm.

Design and planning 
The school follows a "private-public partnership", one of only a few in the state. The secondary college has modern design and architecture in mind, including smaller learning centres within the school. The school's design model is very similar to that of the regeneration of Dandenong High School model.

About the school
The College is divided into "learning communities". The layout of the College is based on contemporary principles in school design. The learning neighbourhoods include open planned classrooms for up to 25 students, work spaces for small groups, for flexible spaces for art and science in junior levels and links to specialist areas for Design and Technology Studies, Health and Physical Education, and the Performing Arts. They feature open, large scale learning areas, interview spaces that substitute as a work space for 3-4 students, links to the outdoors environment and breakout areas for a range of teaching and learning activities.

The College logo captures the colours in the uniform:
The burnt orange/red is matched to the pin stripe in our girls winter uniform; green/khaki in our trousers and cargo pants; blue is the sports uniform; and white is in the shirt/polo shirt.

References

External links
Alkira Secondary College website

2009 establishments in Australia
Public high schools in Melbourne
Educational institutions established in 2009
Buildings and structures in the City of Casey